Oxymeris is a genus of sea snails, marine gastropod molluscs in the family Terebridae, the auger snails.

Species
Species within the genus Oxymeris include:
 Oxymeris albida (Gray, 1834)
 Oxymeris areolata (Link, 1807)
 Oxymeris barbieri (Aubry, 2008)
 Oxymeris caledonica (Sowerby III, 1909)
 Oxymeris cerithina (Lamarck, 1822)
 Oxymeris chlorata (Lamarck, 1822)
 Oxymeris consors (Hinds, 1844)
 Oxymeris crenulata (Linnaeus, 1758)
 Oxymeris dillwynii (Deshayes, 1859)
 Oxymeris dimidiata (Linnaeus, 1758)
 Oxymeris fatua (Hinds, 1844)
 Oxymeris felina (Dillwyn, 1817)
 Oxymeris gouldi (Deshayes, 1857) 
 Oxymeris lineopunctata (Bozzetti, 2008)
 Oxymeris maculata (Linnaeus, 1758)
 Oxymeris ngai Thach, 2016
 † Oxymeris plicaria (Basterot, 1825) 
 Oxymeris senegalensis (Lamarck, 1822)
 Oxymeris strigata (Sowerby I, 1825)
 Oxymeris suffusa (Pease, 1889)
 Oxymeris swinneni Terryn & Ryall, 2014
 Oxymeris trochlea (Deshayes, 1857)
Species brought into synonymy
 Oxymeris costellifera (Pease, 1869): synonym of Duplicaria costellifera (Pease, 1869)
 Oxymeris troendlei (Bratcher, 1981): synonym of Oxymeris felina (Dillwyn, 1817)

References

 Bratcher T. & Cernohorsky W.O. (1987). Living terebras of the world. A monograph of the recent Terebridae of the world. American Malacologists, Melbourne, Florida & Burlington, Massachusetts. 240pp.
 Terryn Y. (2007). Terebridae: A Collectors Guide. Conchbooks & NaturalArt. 59pp + plates
 Severns M. (2011) Shells of the Hawaiian Islands - The Sea Shells. Conchbooks, Hackenheim. 564 pp

External links
 Gray J.E. (1847). A list of the genera of recent mollusca, their synonyma and types. Proceedings of the Zoological Society of London. 15: 129-219
 Bartsch, P. (1923). A key to the family Terebridae. The Nautilus. 37(2): 60-64
 Adams H. & Adams A. (1853-1858). The genera of Recent Mollusca; arranged according to their organization. London, van Voorst. Vol. 1: xl + 484 pp.; vol. 2: 661 pp.; vol. 3: 138 pls. [Published in parts: Vol. 1: i-xl (1858), 1-256 (1853), 257-484 (1854). Vol. 2: 1-92 (1854), 93-284 (1855), 285-412 (1856), 413-540 (1857), 541-661 (1858). Vol. 3: pl. 1-32 (1853), 33-96 (1855), 97-112 (1856), 113-128 (1857), 129-138 (1858) 
 Dall W.H. (1903). Synopsis of the family Astartidae, with a review of the American species. Proceedings of the United States National Museum. 26(1342): 933-951, pl. 42-43.

Terebridae
Gastropod genera